Sabio is a surname. Notable people with the surname include:

Camilo Sabio (born 1936), Filipino politician and lawyer
Guadalupe Sabio (born 1977), Spanish scientist
Jason Sabio, (born 1986), Filipino soccer player
Raymundo Taco Sabio (1945-2022), Filipino Roman Catholic priest